Boy of the South Seas is a children's novel by Eunice Tietjens. It tells the story of Teiki of the Marquesas Islands who, after accidentally stowing away on a visiting ship, makes a new life on the island of Moorea. The book is illustrated by Myrtle Sheldon. It was first published in 1931 and was a Newbery Honor recipient in 1932.

References

1931 American novels
American children's novels
Newbery Honor-winning works
Novels set in Oceania
Novels set on islands
French Polynesia in fiction
1931 children's books